"Audition (The Fools Who Dream)" is a song from the film La La Land (2016). The music of the song was composed by Justin Hurwitz while the lyrics were provided by Benj Pasek and Justin Paul. In the film, the song is performed by Emma Stone. It received a nomination for Best Original Song at the 89th Academy Awards.

Inspiration 
Justin Hurwitz, the composer of the song, discussed the inspiration of the song:

Accolades

Chart performance

See also 
 Another Day of Sun
 City of Stars

References 

2016 songs
2010s ballads
Pop ballads
Songs written by Justin Paul (songwriter)
Songs written by Benj Pasek
Songs written for films
Songs with music by Justin Hurwitz
Songs from La La Land